Fritz Arthur Jusélius (13 June 1855 Pori  – 8 February 1930) was a Finnish industrialist and a member of parliament.

In 1903 Juselius built the Juselius Mausoleum as the last resting place of his daughter Sigrid, who died at the age of 11.

References 

1855 births
1930 deaths
Finnish politicians
People from Pori